Elena Loyo Menoyo (born 11 January 1983) is a Spanish long-distance runner.

Achievements

Beauty Pageant
Elena was crowned Miss Álava in 2005 and went on to compete at Miss Spain 2006, without getting the title.

References

External links
 
 
 
 

1982 births
Living people
Sportspeople from Vitoria-Gasteiz
Spanish female long-distance runners
Spanish female marathon runners
Mediterranean Games bronze medalists for Spain
Mediterranean Games medalists in athletics
Athletes (track and field) at the 2018 Mediterranean Games
Athletes from the Basque Country (autonomous community)
Athletes (track and field) at the 2020 Summer Olympics
Olympic athletes of Spain
21st-century Spanish women
20th-century Spanish women